Diego Martín Dorta Montes (born 31 December 1971 in Montevideo) is a retired Uruguayan footballer who played as a midfielder. He was part of the Uruguay squad which won 1995 Copa América.

Dorta started his professional playing career in 1988 with Central Español. In 1992, he joined Peñarol where he won three consecutive league titles with the club.

After 1995 Copa América, Dorta joined Argentine club Independiente but he never fully settled, and eventually returned to Peñarol in 1998.

Titles

References

External links

 profile at Tenfield
 Argentine Primera statistics

1971 births
Living people
Footballers from Montevideo
Uruguayan footballers
Uruguay under-20 international footballers
Uruguay international footballers
1995 Copa América players
Association football midfielders
Uruguayan Primera División players
Argentine Primera División players
Central Español players
Peñarol players
Club Atlético Independiente footballers
Uruguayan expatriate footballers
Expatriate footballers in Argentina
Copa América-winning players